Alberto Giuliatto (born 17 September 1983) is an Italian–Canadian football (soccer) player who plays as a left defender for Italian third division club Venezia, on loan from Parma F.C.

Career
Giuliatto started his career at Treviso, his hometown team, but he made his debut with Belluno in the Italian Serie D. He played there for four seasons, including a one-year spell in the Serie C2. In 2005, he returned to Treviso and became the first player from Treviso to play for his local side in the Serie A, where he made his debut on 18 September 2005 against Lazio at the Stadio Olimpico and played in 18 matches.

Lecce
The next season saw him in the Serie B on the books of Treviso (until January 2007) and U.S. Lecce, who signed him in the winter transfer window to replace Erminio Rullo, in co-ownership deal for €1.3 million. In June 2007 Lecce acquired him outright for undisclosed fee. In 2007-08 he appeared in 23 matches as Lecce celebrated his return to Serie A. Giuliatto was released on 1 July 2011.

Nocerina
In second half of 2011–12 Serie B season he joined A.S.G. Nocerina. He became a free agent again on 1 July 2012, after the team relegated to 2012–13 Lega Pro Prima Divisione.

Giuliatto was re-signed by Nocerina in November 2012. However, he sidelined for several months.

On 24 July 2013 he was signed by Serie A club Parma but on 27 July 2013 farmed to the third division club Savona along with Gabriele Puccio and Alberto Galuppo.

On 23 July 2014 he was signed by F.B.C. Unione Venezia.

References

External links 
 Giuliatto's profile (from U.S. Lecce official website)

1983 births
Treviso F.B.C. 1993 players
Italian footballers
Canadian soccer players
Living people
Serie A players
Serie B players
U.S. Lecce players
Sportspeople from Treviso
Association football defenders
Footballers from Veneto